Jaime Gómez Valencia (born 17 July 1993) is a Mexican professional footballer who plays as a right-back for Liga MX club Juárez.

Club career
In 2011, Gómez joined the youth squad of Querétaro. On 27 October 2012, he made his official debut with the first squad, on a league match against San Luis. He spent time on loan with second-division side Irapuato in 2014.

Gómez played as a right-back in Querétaro's Apertura 2016 Copa MX triumph over Guadalajara, and as a midfielder in their 2017 Supercopa MX victory over Club América.

Honours
Querétaro
Copa MX: Apertura 2016
Supercopa MX: 2017

References

1993 births
Living people
Footballers from Querétaro
Association football fullbacks
Mexican footballers
Querétaro F.C. footballers
Irapuato F.C. footballers